Arginbaatar is a genus of extinct mammal from the Lower Cretaceous of Mongolia. It was a member of the Multituberculata, an order which is also extinct. It belongs to the family Arginbaataridae (Hahn & Hahn 1983). The genus Arginbaatar was named by Trofimov B.A. in 1980. Baatar is Mongolian for "hero" or "warrior."

The primary species, Arginbaatar dmitrievae, was also named by Trofimov. The fossil remains date to the Aptian or Albian (Lower Cretaceous) of Mongolia.

This genus is the only known member of its family, which is thus monotypic. Some characteristics are "Plagiaulacida"-like, while others are more akin to the further derived suborder of Cimolodonta. Exactly where it fits in is unclear. "This family shows a mixture of 'plagiaulacidan' and cimolodontan characters" (Kielan-Jaworowska & Hurum, 2001, p. 415).

References
 Trofimov (1980) Multituberculata and Symmetrodonta from the Lower Cretaceous deposits in Mongolia. Trans. (Dokl) USSR Acad Sci, Earth Sci Sect 251. p. 188-191.
 Kielan-Jaworowska Z & Hurum JH (2001), "Phylogeny and Systematics of multituberculate mammals". Paleontology 44, p. 389-429.
 Much of this information has been derived from MESOZOIC MAMMALS: Plagiaulacidae, Albionbaataridae, Eobaataridae & Arginbaataridae, an Internet directory.

Multituberculates
Early Cretaceous mammals of Asia
Extinct mammals of Asia
Fossil taxa described in 1980
Prehistoric mammal genera